María Alejandra Paredes Orejuela (born January 6, 1983) is an Ecuadorian actress. She is best known for her character Penélope de la Cruz on the TV series .

Biography
Alejandra Paredes was born in Guayaquil on January 6, 1983, the daughter of Lorgia Orejuela, a prominent Ecuadorian swimmer. At age 17, she was a model for Denisse Klein's agency. She began her television career on the Ecuavisa series . Her most recognized role is that of Penelope de la Cruz on the black comedy series , where she appeared alongside  and Flor María Palomeque. She has served as the public relations officer for the Paradox School of Image and Sound.

In theater, she directed the micro-drama La balada de John y Yoko, and the children's productions Los grillos sordos and Chiquititas.

In 2019, Paredes appeared on the second season of the biographical telenovela . From 2019 to 2020, she was on the fifth and sixth seasons of the series .

In 2020, she made her film debut as part of the cast of the historical drama Camino a la libertad, along with Emmanuel Palomares, Efraín Ruales, Verónica Pinzón, and Juan Carlos Román. The same year, she replaced Carolina Jaume on the TC Televisión series .

Roles

TV series and telenovelas

Theater

Actress
 La pareja feliz ... Penélope Cruzeta
 El amante
 Cat on a Hot Tin Roof
 Hollywood somos nosotras
 Radio Maja...dera ... Penélope Cruzeta
 A 2.50 la cuba libre

Director
 La balada de John y Yoko
 Los grillos sordos
 Chiquititas

Film
 Camino a la libertad ... Ana Garaycoa de Villamil

References

1983 births
21st-century Ecuadorian actresses
Living people
People from Guayaquil
Ecuadorian film actresses
Ecuadorian stage actresses
Ecuadorian telenovela actresses